The 2021 Oldham Metropolitan Borough Council election took place on 6 May 2021 to elect members of Oldham Metropolitan Borough Council in England. This was on the same day as other local elections. One-third of the seats were up for election.

Results

Ward results

Alexandra

Chadderton Central

Chadderton North

Chadderton South

Coldhurst

Crompton

Failsworth East

Failsworth West

Hollinwood

Medlock Vale

Royton North

Royton South

Saddleworth North

Saddleworth South

Saddleworth West and Lees

Shaw

St James

St Mary’s

Waterhead

Werneth

References 

Oldham
Oldham Council elections